The Stillwater Range is a mountain range located in western Nevada in the United States. It cuts across the center of Churchill County and extends partway into Pershing County.

The Stillwater Range separates the Carson Sink (to the west) from Dixie Valley (to the east). To the north, a low pass separates it from the East Range. To the south, the Sand Springs Pass separates it from the Sand Springs Range.

A series of earthquakes measuring 6.6–7.1 on the Richter Scale, centered beneath or near the Stillwater Range, occurred between July and December 1954. As the area was then (and still is) sparsely populated, no fatalities and little property damage resulted.  Extensive surface rupturing can be seen on the east slope of the range.

Several small mines can be found in the cliffsides of the mountains, many of which may not be marked on maps. Water running off the mountains is sometimes used to irrigate alfalfa fields. A notable point is the Steam Tractor Trail that begins of the eastern side. At the top of the trail is a steam tractor that was left there when the road was originally made.

The principal peaks of the Stillwater Range include Table Mountain, Mount Lincoln and Job Peak.

Notes 

Mountain ranges of Nevada
Mountain ranges of the Great Basin
Mountain ranges of Churchill County, Nevada
Mountain ranges of Pershing County, Nevada